Kenneth Loxton (birth registered third ¼ 1947) is an English former professional rugby league footballer who played in the 1960s and 1970s.

Background
Ken Loxton's birth was registered in Lower Agbrigg district, Wakefield, West Riding of Yorkshire, England.

Playing career

International honours
Ken Loxton won a cap for Great Britain while at Huddersfield in 1971 against New Zealand.

Club career
Loxton made his début for Featherstone Rovers on Wednesday 22 May 1963, he joined Huddersfield from amateur club Normanton in 1965. He went on to play for Keighley, Halifax and Bramley, he appears to have scored no drop-goals (or field-goals as they are currently known in Australasia), but prior to the 1974–75 season all goals, whether; conversions, penalties, or drop-goals, scored 2-points, consequently prior to this date drop-goals were often not explicitly documented, therefore '0' drop-goals may indicate drop-goals not recorded, rather than no drop-goals scored.

References

External links
!Great Britain Statistics at englandrl.co.uk (statistics currently missing due to not having appeared for both Great Britain, and England)
Statistics at rugbyleagueproject.org

1947 births
Living people
Bramley RLFC players
English rugby league players
Featherstone Rovers players
Great Britain national rugby league team players
Halifax R.L.F.C. players
Huddersfield Giants players
Keighley Cougars players
Rugby league halfbacks
Rugby league players from Wakefield